Jalan Tanjung Gelang, Federal Route 435, is a federal road in Kuantan, Pahang, Malaysia. It is a main route to the Royal Malaysian Navy (TLDM) Tanjung Gelang Naval Base.

The Kilometre Zero is located at the entrance to the Royal Malaysian Navy (TLDM) Tanjung Gelang Naval Base.

At most sections, the Federal Route 435 was built under the JKR R5 road standard, with a speed limit of 90 km/h.

List of junctions

References

Malaysian Federal Roads